Adelino Mano Quetá (1943 or 1944-2014) was a Guinea-Bissauan politician and diplomat. Quetá ran as an independent in the 2005 Guinea-Bissau presidential election, where he finished ninth in a field of thirteen candidates. He was appointed foreign minister in 2009, replacing Adiato Diallo Nandigna.

Career
Quetá was Attorney General of Guinea-Bissau in 1985. From 1997 to 1998, he was the ambassador to Morocco, Italy, Spain and Taiwan. From 1999 to 2000, he was ambassador to Portugal. In the run-up to the 2005 presidential election, Quetá was diplomatic advisor to interim President Henrique Rosa and lecturer at Amílcar Cabral University in Bissau.

He died in June 14, 2014, in Bissau.

References

Bissau-Guinean diplomats
Ambassadors of Guinea-Bissau to Morocco
Ambassadors of Guinea-Bissau to Italy
Ambassadors of Guinea-Bissau to Spain
Ambassadors of Guinea-Bissau to Taiwan
Ambassadors of Guinea-Bissau to Portugal
Foreign Ministers of Guinea-Bissau
2014 deaths
Year of birth uncertain
1940s births